General Mario Daubenfeld (born 16 January 1958 in Wasserbillig) is a Luxembourgian soldier and a former Chief of Defence of the Luxembourg Army. He is also a political activist.

He replaced Gaston Reinig as Chief of Defence in 2013.  He was replaced by Romain Mancinelli in 2014.

He is an active member of the Alternativ Demokratesch Reformpartei (ADR), a conservative political party in Luxembourg. Since 2016, he has been the President of the Bezierk Center.

References

This article incorporates text from the corresponding article in the German Wikipedia.

This article incorporates text from the corresponding article in the Luxembourgian Wikipedia.

Luxembourgian soldiers
1958 births
Living people
People from Mertert